MEPIRAPIM is an indole-based cannabinoid which differs from JWH-018 by having a 4-methylpiperazine group in place of the naphthyl group and has been used as an active ingredient in synthetic cannabis products. It was first identified in Japan in 2013, alongside FUBIMINA. MEPIRAPIM acts as a T-type calcium channel inhibitor and is only minimally active at the central CB1 receptor.

Legality

Sweden's public health agency suggested to classify MEPIRAPIM as hazardous substance on November 10, 2014.

See also
 APICA
 AM-2201
 JWH-073
 JWH-250
 JWH-200
 List of JWH cannabinoids
 List of AM cannabinoids
 THJ-2201

References

Indoles
Cannabinoids
Designer drugs
Piperazines